Radicals for Capitalism: A Freewheeling History of the Modern American Libertarian Movement is a 2007 book about the history of 20th-century American libertarianism by journalist and Reason  senior editor Brian Doherty. He traces the evolution of the movement, as well as the life stories of Ayn Rand, Milton Friedman, Ludwig von Mises, F. A. Hayek, and Murray Rothbard, and details how they intertwined.

Doherty does not proceed strictly in chronological order, preferring instead to break up the action into short stories on central themes.

Reception
Radicals for Capitalism was reviewed in The New York Times, the City Journal, The San Diego Union-Tribune and The Washington Times. The Guardian proclaimed it to be "the standard history of the libertarian movement for years to come".

See also
 For a New Liberty

References

Further reading

External links 
 Review of Radicals for Capitalism, The Mises Review (and another)
 Interview with Doherty on Radicals for Capitalism, After Words, February 10, 2007

2007 non-fiction books
21st-century history books
American non-fiction books
Books about economic history
Books in political philosophy
English-language books
History books about libertarianism
History books about the United States
Libertarian books
PublicAffairs books
Books about the Kochs